Jesús Moré (born 8 March 1979) is a Mexican actor. Born in Mexico and currently resides in Los Angeles, United States. He is an actor graduated from the Centro de Educación Artística of Televisa, he started his career making recurring roles in Televisa telenovelas. He made himself known thanks to the Telemundo series El Señor de los Cielos, where he plays Omar Terán.

Filmography

References

External links 
 

1979 births
Living people
21st-century Mexican male actors
Mexican male telenovela actors
Mexican male television actors